Basement Screams is the debut EP by American punk rock band Naked Raygun, released on Ruthless Records in 1983. Quarterstick Records reissued the EP in 1999, and added the street version of "I Lie" and the 222 S. Morgan St. sessions as bonus material. The 1982 Morgan St. sessions feature the band's original line-up, which would change significantly by the time the band went into the studio to record Basement Screams the following year, and then again with the release of Naked Raygun's first full-length LP.

Track listing

Personnel
Jeff Pezzati - vocals, liner notes for reissue
Santiago Durango - guitar
Camilo Gonzalez - bass (tracks 1-6)
Jim Colao - front cover, drums (tracks 1-6)
Marko Pezzati - bass (tracks 8-14)
Bobby Strange - drums (tracks 8-14)
John Haggerty - saxophone (track 4)
Tim Powell - engineering
Steve Albini - liner notes for reissue
Paul Chabala - recording (tracks 8-14)
Joell Hayes - digital remastering for reissue

References

Naked Raygun albums
1983 debut EPs
Quarterstick Records EPs
Ruthless Records (Chicago) EPs